Maged George Elias Ghattas is an Egyptian politician with a military background. He has been Minister of State for Environmental Affairs since 14 July 2004, initially as part of the cabinet of Prime Minister Ahmed Nazif.

Education
Ghattas graduated with a B.Sc. in Mechanical Power Engineering from the Faculty of Engineering at Ain Shams University in 1971. Joining the military on 1 February 1972, he gained a B.Sc. in Military Science from the Egyptian Military Academy in 1972.

Career
Ghattas took part in the 6th October War against Israel and continued his career in the military. From 6 June 1996 to 5 July 1998, George worked as a military attaché in Rome, Italy. From July 1998 to 11 December 1999 he was Chief of General Stuff for Military Works and Projects Managements in Egypt. From 12 December 1999 to 20 July 2002 he was Military works Management Director. From 21 July 2002 to 13 July 2004 he Chief of the Armed Forces' Engineering Authority.

On 14 July 2004 he was appointed Minister of State for Environmental Affairs. Despite his association with the Mubarak regime, he managed to keep his position in Essam Sharaf's cabinet after the Egyptian Revolution of 2011.

Medals
"Long Services" and "Perfect Example" Medals
"Excellent Service" Medal
Second Degree Medal of The Arab Republic of Egypt
The Order of Merit of the Grand Officer of the Italian Republic (Grande Ufficiale dell'Ordine al Merito della Repubblica Italiana) from H.E. President of the Republic of Italy

Personal life
Ghattas is a Coptic Christian.

See also
Cabinet of Egypt

References

External links
Ministry of State for Environmental Affairs  with profile

1949 births
Living people
National Democratic Party (Egypt) politicians
Environment ministers of Egypt
Politicians from Cairo
Egyptian people of the Yom Kippur War
20th-century Egyptian military personnel
Egyptian Military Academy alumni
Military personnel from Cairo
Coptic Christians from Egypt